Amblygobius is a genus of fish in the family Gobiidae found in the Indian and Pacific Ocean.

Species
There are currently 15 recognized species in this genus:
 Amblygobius albimaculatus (Rüppell, 1830) (Butterfly siltgoby)
 Amblygobius buanensis Herre, 1927 (Buan siltgoby)
 Amblygobius bynoensis (J. Richardson, 1844) (Bynoe siltgoby)
 Amblygobius calvatus G. R. Allen & Erdmann, 2016 (Bald-head siltgoby) 
 Amblygobius cheraphilus G. R. Allen & Erdmann, 2016 (East Indies siltgoby)  
 Amblygobius decussatus (Bleeker, 1855) (Orange-striped siltgoby)
 Amblygobius esakiae Herre, 1939 (Snout-spot siltgoby)
 Amblygobius linki Herre, 1927 (Link's siltgoby)
 Amblygobius nocturnus (Herre, 1945) (Nocturn siltgoby)
 Amblygobius phalaena (Valenciennes, 1837) (White-barred siltgoby)
 Amblygobius semicinctus (E. T. Bennett, 1833) (Half-barred siltgoby)
 Amblygobius sewardii (Playfair, 1867)
 Amblygobius sphynx (Valenciennes, 1837) (Sphinx siltgoby)
 Amblygobius stethophthalmus (Bleeker, 1851) (Freckled siltgoby)
 Amblygobius tekomaji (J. L. B. Smith, 1959)

References

 
Gobiidae
Marine fish genera
Taxa named by Pieter Bleeker